Usha is a  village in Bhatar CD block in Bardhaman Sadar North subdivision of Purba Bardhaman district in the state of West Bengal, India.

History
Census 2011 Usha Village Location Code or Village Code 319825. The village of Usha is located in the Bhatar tehsil of Burdwan district in West Bengal, India.

Demographics
The total geographic area of village is 494.7 hectares. Usha features a total population of 1,279 peoples. There are about 311 houses in Usha  village.

Population and house data

References 

Villages in Purba Bardhaman district